Xanthi (Turkish: İskeçe) is one of the regional units of Greece. It is part of the Region of East Macedonia and Thrace. The capital is Xanthi. Together with the regional units Rhodope and Evros, it forms the geographical region of Western Thrace.

Geography

Xanthi borders the Bulgarian provinces of Smolyan and Kardzhali to the north, and the Aegean Sea to the south. The regional unit of Kavala lies to the west, Drama to the northwest and Rhodope to the east. The Rhodope Mountains cover the northern part of the regional unit. The highest point is Koula, at 1,827m.

The coastal area has a predominantly Mediterranean climate, whereas the northern mountainous part has a colder continental climate.

Administration

The regional unit Xanthi is subdivided into 4 municipalities. These are (number as in the map in the infobox):
Abdera (Avdira, 2)
Myki (3)
Topeiros (4)
Xanthi (1)

Prefecture

Xanthi was established as a prefecture in 1944, when it was split off from the Rhodope Prefecture. As a part of the 2011 Kallikratis government reform, the prefecture  was transformed into a regional unit within the East Macedonia and Thrace region, with no change in its boundaries. At the same time, the municipalities were reorganised, according to the table below.

Transport
GR-2/E90, Via Egnatia, old and new, SW, Cen., S, SE
GR-12/E90, W, Cen.
GR-55
Railway Thesaloniki-Alexandroupoli

Culture
The remains of the ancient city of Abdera have been excavated. Subterranean Macedonian tombs from the 2nd century BC have been discovered in Komnina.  
There is a Byzantine castle near the old town of Xanthi. During the 19th century, local tobacco production and commerce developed rapidly. The manors of the old city Xanthi, many of which are still intact, testify to the prosperity of the tobacco merchants during this period.

See also
List of settlements in the Xanthi regional unit
Slavic toponyms of places in Xanthi Prefecture

References

 
Prefectures of Greece
1944 establishments in Greece
Regional units of Eastern Macedonia and Thrace